NO Aurigae is a pulsating variable star in the constellation Auriga.  It is an unusually-luminous asymptotic giant branch star about 3,500 light years away.

Variability

NO Aurigae is listed in the General Catalogue of Variable Stars as a slow irregular variable, indicating that no regularity could be found in the brightness variations.  Other studies have suggested possible periods of 102.1, 173, and 226 days, and would classify it as a semiregular variable star.  The maximum visual magnitude range is 6.05–6.50.

Properties
Most studies of NO Aurigae treat it as a supergiant member of the Auriga OB1 stellar association at about 1.4 kpc.

NO Aurigae is an MS star, intermediate between spectral type M and S.  These are typically Asymptotic Giant Branch stars which can appear with supergiant spectra due to their large size and low mass.  Possible detection of Technetium in the spectrum is a symptom of the third dredge-up which occurs only in late AGB stars.

References

External links
 VSX Entry

Auriga (constellation)
037536
026718
Slow irregular variables
Aurigae, NO
M-type supergiants
1939
Durchmusterung objects
S-type stars
Asymptotic-giant-branch stars